Glanton is a small rural village, in the county of Northumberland, England. Agriculture dominates the surrounding area.

Governance 
Glanton is in the parliamentary constituency of Berwick-upon-Tweed. As a  district, it is a part of the unitary authority of Northumberland.

Landmarks
The Devil's Causeway passes the eastern edge of the village. The causeway was a Roman road which started at Port Gate on Hadrian's Wall, north of Corbridge, and extended  northwards across Northumberland to the mouth of the River Tweed at Berwick-upon-Tweed.

Notable people
Hugh Trevor-Roper, Lord Dacre of Glanton, historian

References

External links

Glanton Online
North Northumberland Online

Villages in Northumberland